Time is a studio album by the R&B band Atlantic Starr, released in 1994. The first single was "I'll Remember You". "Everybody's Got Summer" peaked at No. 36 on the UK Singles Chart.

Critical reception

The Republican wrote that the group "tries out a few new tricks, most successfully on the rock solid groove of 'Everybody's Got Summer'."

Track listing 
 "I'll Remember You" (Stacey Piersa, Elliot Wolff) - 4:21
 "Everybody's Got Summer" (Les Pierce, Nick Trevisick) - 4:32
 "My Best Friend" (David Lewis, Wayne Lewis) - 4:50
 "Time" (David Lewis, Wayne Lewis) - 4:49
 "Baby Be There" (Diane Warren) - 3:49
 "Let's Just Sneak Around" (David Lewis, Wayne Lewis) - 4:21
 "So Good To Come Home To" (Diane Warren) - 4:03
 "Lovin' You All Over Again" (Dorothy Sea Gazeley, Doug Lenier, David Lewis, Wayne Lewis) - 4:58
 "Animal Attraction" (Jonathan Lewis, Wayne Lewis) - 4:28
 "Along The Way" (David Lewis) - 3:20

References

External links
 R&B Haven

Atlantic Starr albums
1994 albums
Arista Records albums